The Auburn Athletics were a minor league baseball franchise based in Auburn, Nebraska from 1910 to 1913. The "Athletics" or interchangeable "A's" were the only minor league team hosted in Auburn, playing as members of the Class D level Missouri-Iowa-Nebraska-Kansas League for the duration of the league.

History
In 1910, the Auburn Athletics became the first minor league team based in Auburn, Nebraska. The Auburn Athletics began play as charter members of the six–team Class D level Missouri-Iowa-Nebraska-Kansas League, which was known informally as the "MINK League". Auburn was joined in the 1910 MINK League by the Clarinda Antelopes, Falls City Colts, Maryville Comets, Nebraska City Forresters and Shenandoah Pin Rollers as charter members.

In their first season, the 1910 Auburn Athletics finished with a 46–51 record and placed 4th in the MINK League standings under
manager W. Cummings. Auburn finished 11.0 games behind the 1st place Falls City Colts, as the league had no playoff system for its duration. In 1910, Auburn had total home season attendance of 10,522 an average of 217 fans per home game, playing at Legion Memorial Park. Auburn and the other Nebraska-based teams were affected by Sunday laws of the era in Nebraska, which prohibited working on Sundays and therefore disallowed professional baseball to be played on Sunday.

Continuing play in 1911, the Auburn Athletics finished 3rd in the Missouri-Illinois-Nebraska-Kansas League final standings. The Athletics ended the 1911 season with a record of 52–48 under manager L. Higgins, finishing 7.0 games behind the 1st place Maryville Comets/Humboldt Infants. A new grandstand was built at the Auburn home ballpark for the 1911 season.

In 1912, Auburn Athletics or "A's" finished 3rd in the six–team Missouri-Illinois-Nebraska-Kansas League standings. The Athletics ended the 1912 season with a record of 59–41, finishing 2.5 games behind the Nebraska City Forresters who had 61–38 record. Jake Kraninger managed the Auburn team in 1912.

Playing their final season, the Auburn Athletics won a championship in a shortened season. On June 17, 1913, the 1913 Auburn Athletics were in 1st place when the four–team Missouri-Illinois-Nebraska-Kansas League permanently folded. On that date, both the Falls City Colts and Humboldt Infants disbanded, which caused the Missouri-Illinois-Nebraska-Kansas League to fold. At the time, Auburn had a 24–8 record under manager Jake Kraninger and were 9.0 games ahead of the 2nd place Nebraska City Forresters. Nebraska Sunday laws of the era were a factor impacting the success of the league. In 1913, Falls City had moved Sunday home games to Kansas in an effort to avoid the restrictive laws in Nebraska. Auburn has not hosted another minor league franchise.

The ballpark
The Auburn Athletics reportedly played home minor league games at the Legion Memorial Park in Auburn. The exact name of the ballpark during the time the Athletics played there is unknown. A new grandstand was built in 1911. Still in use today as a public park, Legion Memorial Park is designated as a National Historic Park site (one of six in the state of Nebraska). The park is located at 1015 J Street Auburn, Nebraska.

Timeline

Year–by–year records

Notable alumni

Charlie Wheatley (1911)

See also
Auburn Athletics players

References

Defunct minor league baseball teams
Professional baseball teams in Nebraska
Defunct baseball teams in Nebraska
Baseball teams established in 1910
Baseball teams disestablished in 1913
1910 establishments in Nebraska
Missouri-Iowa-Nebraska-Kansas League (minor league) teams
Nemaha County, Nebraska